Commune V is a commune  of Bamako, Mali.

Notable People
Coulibaly Alima Diarra : Community Leader

References 

Communities on the Niger River